The Central Finance and Contracts Unit (CFCU) (Turkish: Merkezî Finans ve İhale Birimi) is a unit within the Undersecretariat of REPUBLIC OF TURKEY
MINISTRY OF TREASURY AND FINANCE of the Republic of Turkey. It was established by a Memorandum of Understanding which is signed between the European Commission and the Republic of Turkey on 14 February 2002 which was subsequently ratified by the Grand National Assembly of Turkey on the 29 January 2003.

The CFCU is taking the responsibility for the overall budgeting, tendering, contracting, payments, accounting and financial reporting aspects of all procurement in the context of the EU funded programmes in Turkey. As a central unit, the CFCU is operating as an independent body but is attached to the Secretariat General for EU Affairs of Turkey and the National Aid Coordinator of Turkey. 

The Central Finance and Contracts Unit is an integral part of the Turkish public administration that will take decisions autonomously under the responsibility of a Programme Authorising Officer (PAO). Although the CFCU is administratively linked (e.g. for logistic support) to the Undersecretariat of Treasury it is run independently.

The CFCU has the sole responsibility over the overall budgeting, tendering, contracting, payments, accounting and financial reporting aspects of the procurement of services, supplies, works and grants in the context of EU funded programmes in Turkey.

The CFCU ensures that the EU rules, regulations and procedures pertaining to the procurement of services, supplies, works and grants are adhered to and that a proper reporting system is functioning.

The CFCU advises the Senior Programme Officers (SPO) within the Line Ministries on EU external aid implementation procedures (e.g. procurement and contracting procedures), however, full responsibility for technical implementation remains with the SPO.

More specifically the CFCU, acting as the Contracting Authority, is entrusted with the following tasks:

Tendering
receiving and reviewing Terms of Reference, Technical Specifications and Works Dossiers prepared by the line ministry 
preparation of tender information and dossiers 
managing the short listing process for international restricted service contracts and in exceptional cases for international restricted works tenders
despatching or arranging the collection of tender dossiers

Evaluation
nominating the composition of the Shortlist Panel and the Tender Evaluation Committee 
acting as the non-voting chairman and non-voting secretary of the Shortlist Panel and Tender Evaluation Committee 
managing the evaluation process according to EC rules and procedures. (These rules and procedures are explained in very much detailed in the Practical Guide to contract procedures financed from the General Budget of the European Communities in the context of External Actions (PRAG) and also published on the internet web site of the EC.)
preparation of the Shortlist and Evaluation reports

Contracting
carrying out contract negotiations, where appropriate 
drafting, preparation and signature of contracts by the PAO (endorsed by the European Commission) on the basis of the request and technical recommendations of the SPO 
endorsement of twinning covenants, where appropriate

Accounting
establishing and maintaining a project and financial accounting system 
making records of payments under signed contracts

Payments
receiving requests for payment from contractors, checking these are legitimate 
carrying out payments in accordance with standard EU procedures in force at the time

Reporting
Providing to the National Fund, for distribution to the NAC and EC Representation in Ankara, monthly reports covering the status of projects being implemented and the financial status of each programme

References
Official Webpage of the CFCU

Government of Turkey